Golspie is located in the Upper Lachlan Shire of New South Wales, Australia. It is primarily a livestock farming area. The closest towns to Golspie are Taralga and Crookwell.

References

Upper Lachlan Shire
Localities in New South Wales
Southern Tablelands